Qareh Said or Qarah Said may refer to:
 Qareh Said, Golestan
 Qareh Said, Zanjan